Temeraire or Téméraire (French for "reckless") may refer to:

 HMS Temeraire, several ships of the Royal Navy
 French ship Téméraire, several ships of the French Navy
 Téméraire-class ship of the line, a class of ships designed and built for the French Navy
 The Fighting Temeraire, a painting by J. M. W. Turner
 Temeraire (series), a series of alternate history/fantasy novels by Naomi Novik
 His Majesty's Dragon, released as Temeraire in the UK, the first novel in the series